Cantonale elections to renew canton general councillors were held in France on 22 and 29 March 1992. The left, in power since 1988, lost 6 departments.

Electoral system

The cantonales elections use the same system as the regional or legislative elections. There is a 10% threshold (10% of registered voters) needed to proceed to the second round.

Change in control

From left to right

Nord
Puy-de-Dôme
Drôme
Gers
Dordogne
Vaucluse

National results

Sources

E-P

1992
1992 elections in France